Ecobank Zimbabwe Limited (EZL), is a commercial bank in Zimbabwe. It is one of the commercial banks licensed by the Reserve Bank of Zimbabwe and a subsidiary of Togo-based Ecobank.

Ecobank Zimbabwe is a small financial services provider in Zimbabwe, serving large corporate clients, upscale retail customers and medium to large business enterprises. The company’s services include personal banking, business banking, global banking and agricultural finance. , the bank's shareholders' equity was estimated at US$42.8 million, and total assets were valued at US$120.2 million.

History
The bank was established in 2002 as Premier Finance Group, a merchant bank.

In January 2011, Ecobank Transnational acquired majority shareholding in Premier Finance Group, at a price of US$10 million. Following the change in ownership, the institution rebranded to Ecobank Zimbabwe in May 2011. It also requested and was granted permission to change its merchant banking license to a  commercial banking license. The Reserve Bank of Zimbabwe granted EBZ a commercial banking license, effective 15 May 2012.

Ownership
Ecobank Zimbabwe is a subsidiary of Ecobank Transnational, the Pan African bank with headquarters in Lome, Togo and a presence in over 30 African countries. Other shareholders in the Zimbabwean subsidiary are shown in the table below:

Branch network
As of January 2012, the bank maintains a network of 15 operational branches, at the following locations:

 Head Office - 2 Piers Road, Harare
 Borrowdale Branch - Block A, Sam Levy’s Office Park, 2 Piers Road, Borrowdale, Harare 
 Bradfield Branch - Stand 16433, Shops 3&4, Zonkizizwe Shopping Centre, Hillside Road, Bradfield, Bulawayo 
 Chiredzi Branch - Stand 360, Mopani Drive, Chiredzi 
 Joina City Branch - Shop U14, Innez Terrace at Jason Moyo Avenue, Harare 
 Mbare Branch - Shops 1&2, Stand 29629, Farmer's Market, Mbare, Harare 
 Nelson Mandela Branch - 35 Nelson Mandela Avenue, Harare
 Parkade Centre Branch - 5 Parkade Centre, Fife Street at 9th Avenue, Bulawayo
 Samora Machel Branch - 137 Samora Machel Avenue, Harare
 Chitungwiza Branch - Chitungwiza
 Mutare Branch - 2A Fidelity Centre, Herbert Chitepo Street, Mutare
 Msasa Branch - Msasa, Harare
 Graniteside Branch - Graniteside, Harare
 Kweke Branch - Beverly house Robert Mugabe way Kwekwe
 Bindura Branch - Robert Mugabe way

See also

 Ecobank
 Ecobank Ghana
 Ecobank Nigeria
 Ecobank Uganda
 List of banks in Zimbabwe
 Economy of Zimbabwe

References

External links
 Website of Ecobank Zimbabwe
 Shareholding In Ecobank Zimbabwe

Banks of Zimbabwe
Banks established in 2002
2002 establishments in Zimbabwe
Companies based in Harare